The Tockwogh were an Algonquian tribe first encountered in 1608 by Captain John Smith's party after being informed about them by the Massawomekes (Iroquois). The name Tockwogh is a variation of tuckahoe, a water plant with bulbous roots used for food. At their first meeting, Smith noticed they wore copper hatchets and beads which were traded with their allies, the Susquehannock, mortal enemies of the Massawomeke. The Indians held a feast for Smith's party. Smith noted that the Tockwogh wigwams were very different from those of other Algonquian peoples: longer, larger, covered with bark, and shaped like ovals. About 20 made a village and villages were surrounded by fields of corn, squash, beans, and tobacco. Before leaving the Tockwoghs, Smith traded blue beads, bells and hatchets for corn, pearls, meat, weapons and hides.

Sources
 Rivers of the Eastern Shore - Seventeen Maryland Rivers by Hulbert Footner

External links
Sassafras Natural Resources Management Area

Eastern Algonquian peoples
Extinct Native American tribes
Native American tribes in Maryland